Emma Hopkins may refer to:

 Emma Curtis Hopkins (1849–1925), American spiritual author and leader
 Emma Hopkins (diplomat), British diplomat